The Slingsby Cadet may refer to:

Slingsby Cadet TX1, military designation for Slingsby Kirby Cadet
Slingsby Cadet TX2, military designation for Slingsby Kirby Tutor
Slingsby Cadet TX3, military designation for Slingsby Tandem Tutor

Glider aircraft